An apse line, or line of apsides, is an imaginary line defined by an orbit's eccentricity vector. It is strictly defined for elliptic, parabolic, and hyperbolic orbits.

For such orbits the apse line is found:
 for elliptical orbitsbetween the orbit's periapsis and apoapsis (also known as the major axis) 
 for parabolic and hyperbolic orbitsbetween the orbit's periapsis and focus

For circular orbits, the apse line is not defined because the eccentricity is equal to zero. As it is required as a base for the definition of true anomaly, it is usually arbitrarily assumed (as a line pointing into the direction of the vernal equinox).

See also 
 Apsidal precession
 Apsis
 Eccentricity (orbit)
 Orbit: circular, elliptic, parabolic and hyperbolic
 True anomaly

References

Orbits